Rosa Rolanda (Rosemonde Cowan; Rose Rolando; Mrs. Miguel Covarrubias; September 6, 1895 – March 25, 1970) was an American multidisciplinary artist, dancer, and choreographer.

Biography
Rolanda was born in Azusa, California, in 1895. Her father, Henry Charles Cowan, was an engineer and her mother, Guadalupe Ruelas, was of Mexican descent. Rolanda began her artistic career in New York in 1916 as a celebrated dancer in Broadway revues. Rolanda’s debut was performed to Shubert’s Over the Top, which sparked a continued dance career throughout the 1920s. After a tour in Europe with the Ziegfeld Follies dance troupe, Rolanda performed in the musical Around the Town. It was soon after while working on Garrick Gaieties, that Rolanda met Miguel Covarrubias on set. She became involved with the Mexican artist Miguel Covarrubias in 1924, and in the following year the couple traveled to Mexico, where Rolanda began to take photographs. Albums of her images were published in Covarrubias's best-selling books Island of Bali (1938)  and Mexico South: Isthmus of Tehuantepec (1946), and her work was also featured in the "Ameridinian" issue of Wolfgang Paalen's journal DYN, published in 1943. During the late 1920s or early 1930s, Rolanda experimented with photograms, creating significant series of surrealist self-portraits that may have been influenced by Man Ray, who photographed Rolanda in Paris in 1923. She probably began painting around 1926. The majority of Rolanda's canvases depict colorful, folkloric scenes of children and festivals, portraits of friends such as the movie actresses Dolores del Río and María Félix, and self-portraits. Rolanda and Covarrubias married in 1930, and by 1935 they had permanently settled into his family home in Tizapan El Alto, close to Mexico City. In 1952 Rolanda exhibited her paintings in a solo show at the prominent Galeria Souza in Mexico City.—P. 7.

By 1952, Covarrubias had completely separated from Rolanda in pursuit of one of his own students, Rocío Sagaón. At this point, Rolanda was producing works, such as Autorretrato (self-portrait), conveying her innermost turmoils onto canvas.

She died in 1970 in Mexico City, Mexico.

Filmography
 The Blue Bird (1918)
 Woman (1918)

References

External links

1895 births
1970 deaths
American female dancers
20th-century American painters
20th-century American photographers
American choreographers
American artists of Mexican descent
People from Azusa, California
20th-century American dancers
20th-century American women
American emigrants to Mexico